BioShock is a 2007 first-person shooter game developed by 2K Boston (later Irrational Games) and 2K Australia, and published by 2K Games. The first game in the BioShock series, it was released for Microsoft Windows and Xbox 360 platforms in August 2007; a PlayStation 3 port by Irrational, 2K Marin, 2K Australia and Digital Extremes was released in October 2008. The game is set in 1960, and follows Jack who discovers the underwater city of Rapture. Built by business magnate Andrew Ryan to be an isolated utopia, the discovery of ADAM, a genetic material which grants superhuman powers, initiated the city's turbulent decline. Jack attempts to escape, fighting ADAM-obsessed enemies and Big Daddies, while engaging with the few sane humans that remain and learning of Rapture's past. The player, as Jack, can defeat foes in several ways by using weapons, utilizing plasmids that give unique powers, and by turning Rapture's defenses against them.

BioShocks concept was developed by Irrational's creative lead, Ken Levine, and incorporates ideas by 20th century dystopian and utopian thinkers such as Ayn Rand, George Orwell, and Aldous Huxley, as well as historical figures such as John D. Rockefeller, Jr. and Walt Disney. The game includes elements of role-playing games, giving the player different approaches in engaging enemies such as by stealth, as well as moral choices of saving or killing characters. Additionally, the game and its biopunk theme borrow concepts from the survival horror genre, notably the Resident Evil series. BioShock is considered a spiritual successor to the System Shock series, on which many of Irrational's team, including Levine, had worked previously. 

BioShock received universal acclaim and was particularly praised by critics for its narrative, themes, visual design, setting, and gameplay. It is considered to be one of the greatest video games ever made and a demonstration of video games as an art form. Bioshock was followed by two sequels, BioShock 2 and BioShock Infinite, released in 2010 and 2013, respectively. Ports of Bioshock were released for macOS and mobile following its console releases. A remastered version of the game was released on Microsoft Windows, PlayStation 4, Xbox One, and Nintendo Switch as part of BioShock: The Collection.

Synopsis

Setting
BioShock takes place in Rapture, a large underwater city planned and constructed in the 1940s by individualist business magnate Andrew Ryan, who wanted to create a utopia for society's elite to flourish outside of government control and "petty morality." This philosophy resulted in remarkable advances in the arts and sciences, which included the discovery of "ADAM": a potent gene-altering substance which is created by a species of sea slug on the ocean floor. ADAM soon led to the creation of "Plasmids," mutagenic serums that grant users super-human powers (such as telekinesis and pyrokinesis). To protect and isolate Rapture, Ryan outlawed any contact with the surface world.

As Rapture flourished, wealth disparities also grew, and conman/businessman Frank Fontaine used his influence over the disenfranchised working class to establish illegal enterprises and attain power—enough to rival even Ryan himself. With doctors Brigid Tenenbaum and Yi Suchong, Fontaine would create his own company dedicated to researching plasmids and gene tonics. As ADAM became addictive and demand skyrocketed, Fontaine secretly mass-produced ADAM through slugs implanted in the stomachs of orphaned girls, nicknamed "Little Sisters." Fontaine was then killed in a shootout with police, and Ryan took the opportunity to seize his assets, including control of the Little Sisters.

In the months that followed, a man amongst the poor named Atlas rose up and began a violent revolution against Ryan, with both sides using plasmid-enhanced humans (known as "Splicers") to wage war on one another. To protect the Little Sisters, Ryan created the "Big Daddies": genetically enhanced humans surgically grafted into gigantic lumbering diving suits designed to escort the sisters as they scavenged ADAM from dead bodies. Tensions came to a head on New Year's Eve of 1958 when Atlas ordered an all-out assault on Ryan and his supporters. The conflict turns Rapture into a war-torn crumbling dystopia, resulting in societal collapse, countless deaths, many Splicers becoming disfigured and insane from ADAM abuse, and the few sane survivors barricading themselves away from the chaos.

Plot

In 1960, the protagonist, Jack, is a passenger on a plane that crashes in the Atlantic Ocean. As the only survivor, Jack makes his way to a nearby lighthouse that houses a bathysphere terminal, which takes him to Rapture. Jack is contacted by Atlas via radio and is guided to confront the perils of the ruined city.

Atlas requests Jack's help in stopping Ryan, directing him to a docked bathysphere where he says Ryan has trapped his family. When Jack first encounters the Little Sisters, Atlas urges him to kill them to harvest their ADAM. Still, Dr. Tenenbaum intervenes and insists Jack should spare them, providing him with a plasmid that can remove the sea slug from their bodies and free them of their brainwashing. Jack eventually works his way to the bathysphere, but Ryan destroys it before Jack can reach it. Infuriated, Atlas has Jack fight his way through various districts toward Ryan's lair, forcing Jack to contend with Rapture's deranged citizens along the way: such as the mad surgical doctor J.S. Steinman and insane artist and musician Sander Cohen.

Eventually, Jack enters Ryan's office, where Ryan is casually playing golf, and explains Jack's true origins. Through his dialogue and the evidence the player can gather up to this point, it is revealed that Jack is actually Ryan's illegitimate son, sold by Ryan's mistress as an embryo to Fontaine, who then had Tenenbaum and Suchong rapidly age Jack into adulthood and turned into an obedient assassin, capable of accessing any of Rapture's systems locked to Ryan's genetic code and thus ensure Fontaine's victory in the war. Jack was then smuggled to the surface with false memories of a normal life, waiting to be called back to Rapture when needed. Ryan suddenly takes control of Jack's actions by asking, "Would you kindly?"; Jack realizes this phrase has preceded many of Atlas' commands as a hypnotic trigger, forcing him to follow any orders without question. Jack also realizes he was responsible for the plane crash, having read a letter onboard containing the same trigger phrase.

Ryan chooses to die by his own will and compels Jack to beat him to death with a golf club. Atlas then reveals himself to be Fontaine, having faked his death and used "Atlas" as an alias to hide his identity while providing a heroic figure for the poor to rally behind. With Ryan finally dead, Fontaine takes control of Ryan's systems and leaves Jack to be killed by hostile security drones. Jack is saved by Dr. Tenenbaum and the Little Sisters, that had been cured, and is helped to remove Fontaine's mental conditioning, including one that would have stopped Jack's heart. Jack pursues Fontaine to his lair, where Fontaine transforms himself into a blue-skinned humanoid creature by injecting himself with a large supply of ADAM. The Little Sisters aid Jack in draining the ADAM from Fontaine's body and eventually kill him.

The ending depends on how the player interacts with the Little Sisters:
 If the player rescues all or all but one of the Little Sisters, Jack takes them back to the surface with him and adopts five of them as his daughters. Tenenbaum happily narrates how they go on to live full lives under his care, eventually surrounding him on his deathbed. This ending is considered canon in BioShock Infinite: Burial at Sea.
 If the player harvests more than one Little Sister, Jack turns on the Little Sisters to harvest their ADAM. Tenenbaum sadly narrates what occurs, condemning Jack and his actions. A US Navy submarine then comes across the plane's wreckage and finds itself suddenly surrounded by bathyspheres containing Splicers, who attack the crew and take control of it. The submarine is revealed to be carrying nuclear missiles, with Tenenbaum claiming that Jack has now "stolen the terrible secrets of the world": The more Little Sisters Jack harvests throughout the game, the harsher and more furious Tenenbaum's narrative becomes.

Gameplay

BioShock is a first-person shooter with role-playing game customization and stealth elements, and is similar to System Shock 2. The player takes the role of Jack as he is guided through Rapture towards various objectives. The player collects multiple weapons and plasmids as they work their way through enemy forces. The player can switch between one active weapon and one active plasmid at any time, allowing them to find combination attacks that can be effective against certain enemies, such as first shocking a Splicer then striking them down with a wrench. Weapons are limited by ammunition that the player collects; many weapons have secondary ammo types that can be used instead for additional benefits, such as bullets that inflict fire damage. Plasmid use consumes a serum called EVE which can be restored using EVE syringes collected by the player or by consuming cigarettes and alcohol. The player has a health meter that decreases when they take damage. The player can restore their health with food or medical packs found throughout Rapture. If the player's health reduces to zero, they will be regenerated at the last Vita-Chamber that they passed with limited amounts of health and EVE. A patch for the game allows players to disable these Vita-Chambers, requiring players to restart a saved game if the character dies.

The game provides several options for players to face challenges. In addition to direct combat, the player can use plasmids to lure enemies into traps or to turn enemies against each other, or employ stealth tactics to avoid detection by hostiles including the security systems and turrets. The player can hack into any of Rapture's automated systems; the hacking process is done via a mini-game similar to Pipe Mania where the player must connect two points on opposite sides of a grid with a limited set of piping within a fixed amount of time, with failure to complete in time costing health and potentially sounding alarms. Early in the game, the player is given a research camera; by taking photographs of enemies, the player will cumulatively gain knowledge about the individual foes which translates into attack boosts and other benefits when facing that enemy type in the future.

The player collects money by exploring Rapture and from the bodies of defeated foes; this money can be used at vending machines to restock on ammunition, health and EVE, and other items; like security cameras, vending machines can also be hacked to reduce the costs of items from it. The player will also receive rewards in the form of ADAM from completing some tasks, as well as from either saving or killing the Little Sisters after defeating their Big Daddy guardian. ADAM is used to purchase new plasmids from Gatherer's Garden machines scattered around Rapture. In addition to plasmids, the player will also collect and buy tonics that provide passive bonuses, such as increasing Jack's strength, using EVE more efficiently, or making Jack more resistant to damage. The player can only have a limited number of plasmids and tonics active at any time, and can swap between the various plasmids and tonics at certain stations located throughout Rapture.

Development

Game design
Lead developer Ken Levine had created Irrational Games in 1997 out of former members from Looking Glass Studios. Their first game was System Shock 2, a sequel to Looking Glass's System Shock, and was met with critical success, though it did not prove a financial one. Levine had attempted to pitch a sequel to System Shock 2 to Electronic Arts, but the publisher rejected the idea based on the poor performance of the earlier game. Irrational would proceed to develop other games, including Freedom Force, Tribes: Vengeance, the canceled title Deep Cover, and the completed The Lost which was never released due to legal complications. At this point, Levine wanted to return to a game in the same style as System Shock 2, a more free-form game with strong narrative.

In 2002, the team had come up with a core gameplay mechanic idea based on three groups of forces; drones that would carry a desirable resource, protectors that would guard the drones, and harvesters that would attempt to take the resource from the drones; these would eventually bear out as the Little Sisters, Big Daddies, and Splicers in the final game, but at the time of the concept, there was no set theme. They began working on creating a setting for the game as to be able to pitch the idea to game publishers. A 2002 demonstration version was based on the Unreal Engine 2 for the first Xbox. This demonstration was primarily set aboard a space station overtaken with genetically-mutated monsters; the main character was Carlos Cuello, a "cult deprogrammer"—a person charged with rescuing someone from a cult, and mentally and psychologically readjusting that person to a normal life. Ken Levine cites an example of what a cult deprogrammer does: "[There are] people who hired people to [for example] deprogram their daughter who had been in a lesbian relationship. They kidnap her and reprogram her, and it was a really dark person, and that was the [kind of] character that you were." This story would have been more political in nature, with the character hired by a Senator. The team collectively agreed that this game was not what they had set out to make, and were having trouble finding a publisher. They considered ending development, but as news about their efforts to create a spiritual successor to System Shock 2 began to appear in gaming magazines and websites, the team opted to continue development, performing a full revamp of the game.

By 2004, 2K Games, a subsidiary of Take-Two Interactive, offered to publish the game primarily based on the drone/protector/harvester concept, giving Irrational the freedom to develop the story and setting. By this point, the story and setting had changed significantly, taking place in an abandoned World War II-era Nazi laboratory that had been recently unearthed by 21st-century scientists. Over the decades, the genetic experiments within the labs had gradually formed themselves into an ecosystem centered on the three groups. This version of the game included many of the gameplay elements that would remain in the final BioShock, themselves influenced by concepts from System Shock 2. These elements included the use of plasmids and EVE, the need to use stealth or other options to deal with automated security systems, direction through the environment from a non-player character relayed over a radio, and story elements delivered through audio recordings and "ghosts" of deceased characters.

While the gameplay with the 2004 reveal was similar to what resulted in the released version of BioShock, both design and story changed, consistent with what Levine says was then-Irrational Games' guiding principle of putting game design first. These areas were also issued due to some internal strife and lack of communication between the various teams within Irrational, part of the result of having to expand the team from six to sixty members for the scope of the project. The environment was considered bland, and there were difficulties by the team's artists to come up with a consistent vision to meet the level designer's goals. A critical junction was a short experiment performed by level designer Jean Paul LeBreton and artist Hoagy de la Plante, setting themselves aside to co-develop a level that would later become part of the "Tea Garden" area in the released game, which Levine would later use as a prime example of a "great BioShock space", emphasizing the need for departments to work together. Levine also found that the cyberpunk theme had been overplayed considering their initial reject from Electronic Arts for System Shock 3, leading towards the underwater setting of Rapture.

The game's lead level designer was Bill Gardner. He cited Capcom's survival horror series Resident Evil as a significant influence on BioShock, stating there are "all these nods and all these little elements that I think you can see where Resident Evil inspired us". The team were particularly influenced by Resident Evil 4, including its approach to the environments, combat, and tools, its game design and tactical elements, its "gameplay fuelled storytelling" and inventory system, and its opening village level in terms of how it "handled the sandbox nature of the combat" and in terms of "the environment".

Story and theme development

The thematic core of BioShock was born when Levine was walking at Rockefeller Center near the GE Building in New York City. He saw the uniqueness of the art deco styling of the building along with imagery around the building such as the statue of Atlas near it, and recognized that these were spaces that had not been experienced in the first-person shooter genre. The history of the Rockefeller Center also fed into the story concept; Levine noted how the Center had started construction prior to the Great Depression; when the primary financiers had pulled out, John D. Rockefeller, Jr. backed the remaining construction to complete the project himself, as stated by Edge magazine "a great man building an architectural triumph against all the odds". The history of Rapture and the character of Andrew Ryan is loosely based on Rockefeller's story. He also considered that many of the characters of Rapture were all people who were oppressed once before in their lives and now free of that oppression, have turned around and become the oppressors, a fact he felt resonated throughout human history.

At this point in the development, the backdrop of Rapture had been fleshed out, but they had yet to come on how to represent the drones, protectors, and harvesters from their original game idea. The Big Daddy concept as the protector class was developed early in the process, but the team had yet to reach a satisfying design for the drones, having used several possible designs including bugs and dogs in wheelchairs. The team wanted to have the player care for the drones in some way and create pathos for these characters. The idea of using little girls came out of brainstorming, but was controversial and shocking within the team at first, recognizing that they could easily be killed and make the game more horrific in the style of Night Trap. However, as Levine worked on the story, he started to incorporate the ideas of dystopian and utopian thinkers from the twentieth century, including Ayn Rand, Aldous Huxley, and George Orwell, and considered their ideas "fascinating". He brought in the ideas of Objectivism that Rand primarily outlined in the book Atlas Shrugged, that man should be driven by selfishness and not altruism, and used this to inform the philosophy behind the city of Rapture and Andrew Ryan's work, viewing them as quite ludicrous, and primed to be applied to an antagonist, tied in with his previous observations on Rockefeller and his writings. This was extended to the use of the little girls as drones (now Little Sisters), particularly the question whether the player should try to save the girls or harvest the ADAM for their benefit. 2K Games expressed concern about the initial mechanic of the Little Sisters, where the player would actively prey on the Little Sister, which would have alerted a Big Daddy and set up the fight with the player. This approach did not sit well with Levine, and 2K Games asserted that they would not ship a game "where the player gets punished for doing the right thing". They altered this approach where the Little Sisters would be invulnerable until the player had dealt with their Big Daddy, though LeBreton considered this "a massive kludge" into the game's fiction. The idea of creating the Little Sisters and presenting the player with this choice became a critical part of the game's appeal to the broader gaming market, although it was met with criticism from some outlets. Levine desired only to have one ending to the game, something that would have left the fate of the characters "much more ambiguous", but publisher pressure directed them to craft multiple endings depending on the choice of harvesting Little Sisters. Levine also noted that "it was never my intention to do two endings for the game. It sort of came very late and it was something that was requested by somebody up the food chain from me."

Other elements came into the story design. Levine had an interest in "stem cell research and the moral issues that go around [it]". Regarding artistic influences, Levine cited the books Nineteen Eighty-Four and Logan's Run, representing societies that have "really interesting ideas screwed up by the fact that we're people". The idea of the mind control used on Jack was offered by LeBreton, inspired by films like The Manchurian Candidate, as a means to provide a better reason to limit the player's actions as opposed to the traditional use of locked doors to prevent them exploring areas they should not. The team had agreed that Jack's actions would be controlled by a key phrase but struggled with coming up with one that would not reveal Atlas' true nature. Levine happened upon "Would you kindly" after working on marketing materials for the game that asked the reader hypothetical questions such as "Would you kill people, even innocent people, to survive?", later working that phrase into the first script for the game.

Numerous tensions within the team and from publisher 2K Games continued during the development process. According to LeBreton, Levine was distrustful of some of the more egotistical newer hires and was often arguing with them to enforce his vision of BioShock. 2K Games was concerned with the growing budget for the title, and told Levine to market the title more as a first-person shooter rather than the first-person shooter/role playing game hybrid they set out for. Near the targeted release date, Levine ordered the team into round-the-clock development, creating more strife in the team. Paul Hellquist, the game's lead designer, was often omitted from key design meetings, which he later recounted was due to his contrary nature to Levine, questioning several of his choices; he used his frustration to put into the design efforts for the Medical Pavilion level that he was in charge of at that time. Near the anticipated completion date, 2K decided to give Irrational another three months to polish up the game, extending the current crunch time the studio was already under. This left some hard-to-discover bugs and issues in the game undiscovered. One such case was an apparent Easter egg found in the remastered version in 2018, where under certain conditions, the player can end up looking at an object with the description "Paul Hellquist did not do his Job". Both Levine and Chris Kline, the game's lead programmer confirmed the message was a cheeky jab at Hellquist left as a debugging message; Kline and Hellquist were developing the systems to show descriptions of objects to players when looked at, and Hellquist offered to complete all the necessary descriptions in-game; to jokingly help prod Hellquist along, Kline put "Paul Hellquist did not do his Job" as the default message within the executable code. While the code message was changed for the original release, the remastered version likely used a pre-final version of the BioShock code, according to Kline. Hellquist took the revelation in good humor and tweeted that other Easter eggs should have been added to the game to display, "If you are enjoying this, Paul Hellquist did his job."

A critical playtest of the game occurred in January 2007, where initial feedback from the players was mostly negative, including issues of the setting being too dark, having no idea where to go, and distrusting Atlas, who at the time was voiced in a southern drawl, described as a "lecherous Colonel Sanders". The team took this criticism to heart, revamping several elements during those extra months such as improving the lighting, implementing a quest marker, and using an Irish voice for Atlas to make him sound more trustworthy. During another late-stage playtest with the title "ninety-nine percent" complete according to Levine, the playtesters did not like the game at all as they felt no connection to the player-character Jack, and the person overseeing the tests told Levine that the game was likely to be a failure. At this point, BioShock did not have many cutscenes, as Levine was ideologically opposed to them. However, the following day, Levine and the lead group came up with a "cheap" way to correct this, by adding the initial cut scene within the plane and the subsequent plane crash, as this helped to set the time frame, place the player in the role of the character, and alluded to the "would you kindly" line later in the game. Levine likened this approach to the initial aircraft crash at the onset of the television show Lost to quickly establish character and setting.

The game was successfully released in August 2007 with a final budget of about $25 million. In a 2016 interview, Levine felt that the game could have used about six more months of development to improve the gun combat system and fix lagging issues that occurred during the final boss fight. Despite the critical success of the title, many of those on the team would leave Irrational to pursue other projects due to late development strife that occurred.

In an interview in 2018, Levine had come to recognize that BioShock reflected several Jewish themes, though this was not intentional. Levine, who considers himself culturally Jewish but does not follow Judaism, had grown up in New Jersey but spent much of his childhood time with his father who worked in Manhattan's Diamond District and visiting his grandparents in Queens, a neighborhood with a large proportion of Eastern European immigrants. Thus, Levine was exposed to much of the Jewish culture that flourished in the area following World War II and understood some of the anxiety Jewish people faced. In the 2018 interview, Levine recognized several of the characters, including Andrew Ryan (who was inspired by Ayn Rand who was also Jewish), Sander Cohen, and Brigid Tenenbaum, were written all as Jewish, and all seeking to escape a world they felt they did not fit into by going to Rapture; Levine said "'There's literal displacement and then there's a feeling of not fitting in, of 'I don't really belong here'. I think Jews are always going to feel a little bit like they don't belong wherever they are. There's always that 'what if we have to flee' mentality."

Game engine
BioShock uses a heavily modified Unreal Engine 2.5 with some of the advanced technologies from Unreal Engine 3. Irrational had previous experience with modifying and expanding on the Unreal Engine in SWAT 4, and continued this advancement of the engine within BioShock. One significant improvement they added was improved water effects, given the nature of the game's setting, hiring a programmer and artist to focus on the water effects. This graphical enhancement has been lauded by critics, with GameSpot saying, "Whether it's standing water on the floor or sea water rushing in after an explosion, it will blow you away every time you see it." BioShock also uses the Havok Physics engine that allows for an enhancement of in-game physics, the integration of ragdoll physics, and allows for more lifelike movement by elements of the environment. The Windows version was built to work in both Direct3D 10 (DirectX 10) and DirectX 9, with the DirectX 10 version supporting additional water and particle effects.

Soundtrack

BioShock contains both licensed music and an original score. The licensed music from the 1930s, 1940s, and 1950s can be heard playing on phonograph throughout Rapture. In total, 30 licensed songs can be heard throughout the game. The original score was composed by Garry Schyman. He composed his pieces to blend with the chosen licensed music as to keep the same feel, while also trying to bring out something that was "eerie, frightening and at times beautiful" to mesh well with Rapture's environments.

2K Games released an orchestral score soundtrack on their official homepage on August 24, 2007. Available in MP3 format, the score—composed by Garry Schyman—contains 12 of the 22 tracks from the game. The Limited Edition version of the game came with The Rapture EP remixes by Moby and Oscar The Punk. The three remixed tracks on the CD include "Beyond the Sea", "God Bless the Child" and "Wild Little Sisters"; the original recordings of these songs are in the game. BioShock score was released on a vinyl LP with the BioShock 2 Special Edition.

Release and promotion

An initial demo of the game was made available in August 2007 for Xbox 360 and Microsoft Windows. This demo included cutscenes to introduce the player to Rapture, the game's tutorial section, and its first levels; the demo also included weapons, plasmids, and tonics that would otherwise be introduced later in the full title, as to give the player more of the features that would be found in the published game. The Xbox 360 demo was the fastest demo at that time to reach one million downloads on the Xbox Live service. The full game was released for these platforms on August 21, 2007.

The first patch for the Xbox 360 version was released about two weeks after release to fix some of the game stability issues players had reported. The patch was found to introduce more problems to the game for some users, including occasional freezes, bad framerates, and audio-related issues, though methods to resolve these issues through the console's cache system were outlined by Irrational Games.

In December 2007, a common patch was released for both the Xbox 360 and Windows version. The patch included additional content such as new Plasmids, new achievements for the Xbox 360 version, and additional graphics settings to address some of the field-of-view issues identified by players. (See below). The patch also added in an option to disable the use of Vita-Chambers, a feature requested by players to make the game more challenging, as well as an achievement to complete the game at its hardest setting without using a Vita-Chamber.

Ports
In an August 2007 interview, when asked about the possibility of a PlayStation 3 version of BioShock, Ken Levine had stated only that there was "no PS3 development going on" at the time; however, on May 28, 2008, 2K Games confirmed that a PlayStation 3 version of the game was in development by 2K Marin, and it was released on October 17, 2008. On July 3, 2008, 2K Games announced a partnership with Digital Extremes and said that the PlayStation 3 version is being developed by 2K Marin, 2K Boston, 2K Australia, and Digital Extremes. Jordan Thomas was the director for the PlayStation 3 version. While there were no graphical improvements to the game over the original Xbox 360 version, the PlayStation 3 version offered the widescreen option called "horizontal plus", introduced via a patch on the 360 version, while cutscene videos were of a much higher resolution than in the DVD version. Additional add-on content was also released exclusively for the PlayStation 3 version. One addition was "Survivor Mode", in which the enemies were made tougher, and Vita-Chambers provided less of a health boost when used, forcing the player to be more creative in approaching foes and to rely more on the less-used plasmids in the game. BioShock also supports Trophies and PlayStation Home. A demo version was released on the PlayStation Store on October 2, 2008.  An update for the PlayStation 3 version was released on November 13, 2008, to fix some graphical problems and occasions where users experienced a hang and were forced to reset the console. This update also incorporated the "Challenge Room" and "New Game Plus" features.

A port to OS X systems was made by Feral Interactive and released in October 2009.

In early 2008, IG Fun secured the rights to develop and publish a mobile phone version of BioShock. This version was developed as a top-down, two-dimensional platformer that attempted to recreate most of the plot and game elements of the original title; IG Fun worked with Irrational to determine the critical story elements they wanted to keep in the game.  IG Fun recognized they would not be able to include the full storyline within a single mobile title, and so planned to split the title into three "episodes". Only the first episode was released.

Another mobile port was developed by Tridev, known as BioShock 3D, released in 2010. Several parts of the game were reduced to single image graphics and the main gameplay engine had to use low-resolution and low-polygon models due to the limitations of mobile phones at the time of its release.

A port to iOS devices done by the 2K China studio was released on August 27, 2014. The iOS version is content complete and functionally equivalent to the original Xbox 360 and Windows version, featuring either the use of touch-screen virtual gamepad controls or the use of a Bluetooth-enabled controller, and with a graphics engine optimized for iOS devices. The game was later delisted from the App Store in September 2015; the game had become unplayable for many that upgraded to iOS 8.4 on their devices, and while a patch had been discussed, a 2K representative stated that the decision to remove the game came from the developer. 2K later clarified that they will be working on resolving the issues with the game's compatibility with the new firmware and will re-release the title once that has been completed. However, by January 2017, 2K officially stated that it will no longer working to support the game's compatibility with newer iOS system.

Reception

Critical response

BioShock has received "universal acclaim", according to review aggregator Metacritic, with the game receiving an average review score of 96/100 for Xbox 360 and Microsoft Windows, and 94/100 for PlayStation 3. , it is one of the highest-rated games on Metacritic, tied with several other games for the fourth-highest aggregate score. Mainstream press reviews have praised the immersive qualities of the game and its political dimension. The Boston Globe described it as "a beautiful, brutal, and disquieting computer game ... one of the best in years", and compared the game to Whittaker Chambers' 1957 riposte to Atlas Shrugged, "Big Sister Is Watching You". Wired also mentioned the Ayn Rand connection (a partial anagram of Andrew Ryan) in a report on the game which featured a brief interview with Levine. The Chicago Sun-Times review said "I never once thought anyone would be able to create an engaging and entertaining video game around the fiction and philosophy of Ayn Rand, but that is essentially what 2K Games has done ... the rare, mature video game that succeeds in making you think while you play".

The Los Angeles Times review concluded, "Sure, it's fun to play, looks spectacular and is easy to control. But it also does something no other game has done to date: It really makes you feel." The New York Times reviewer described it as: "intelligent, gorgeous, occasionally frightening" and added, "Anchored by its provocative, morality-based story line, sumptuous art direction and superb voice acting, BioShock can also hold its head high among the best games ever made."

GameSpy praised BioShock "inescapable atmosphere", and Official Xbox Magazine lauded its "inconceivably great plot" and "stunning soundtrack and audio effects." The gameplay and combat system have been praised for being smooth and open-ended, and elements of the graphics, such as the water, were commended for their quality. It has been noted that the combination of the game's elements "straddles so many entertainment art forms so expertly that it's the best demonstration yet how flexible this medium can be. It's no longer just another shooter wrapped up in a pretty game engine, but a story that exists and unfolds inside the most convincing and elaborate and artistic game world ever conceived."

Reviewers did highlight a few negative issues in BioShock, however. The recovery system involving "Vita-Chambers", which revive a defeated player at half-health, but do not alter the enemies' health, makes it possible to wear down enemies through sheer perseverance, and was criticized as one of the most significant flaws in the gameplay. IGN noted that both the controls and graphics of the Xbox 360 version are inferior to those of the PC version, in that switching between weapons or plasmids is easier using the PC's mouse than the 360's radial menu, as well as the graphics being slightly better with higher resolutions. The game has been touted as a hybrid first-person shooter, but two reviewers found advances from comparable games lacking, both in the protagonist and in the challenges he faces. Some reviewers also found the combat behavior of the splicers lacking in diversity (and their A.I. behavior not very well done), and the moral choice too much "black and white" to be interesting. Some reviewers and essayists such as Jonathan Blow also claimed that the "moral choice" the game offered to the player (saving or harvesting the little sisters) was flawed because, to them, it had no real impact on the game, which ultimately lead them to think that the sisters were just mechanics of no real importance. Daniel Friedman for Polygon concurred with Blow, noting that the player only loses 10% of the possible ADAM rewards for saving the Little Sisters rather than killing them, and felt that this would have been better instituted as part of the game difficulty mechanic. Former LucasArts developer Clint Hocking wrote a noted essay that claimed that BioShock exhibited "ludonarrative dissonance" between its story and mechanics, as while he saw the story as advocating selflessness in helping others, its gameplay encourages what he views as selfishness by preying on Little Sisters.

Awards
At E3 2006, BioShock was given several  "Games of the Show" awards from various online gaming sites, including GameSpot, IGN, GameSpy and GameTrailers's Trailer of the Year. BioShock received an award for Best Xbox 360 Game at the 2007 Leipzig Games Convention.  After the game's release, the 2007 Spike TV Video Game Awards selected BioShock as Game of the Year, Best Xbox 360 Game, and Best Original Score, and nominated it for four awards: Best Shooter, Best Graphics, Best PC Game, and Best Soundtrack. The game also won the 2007 BAFTA "Best Game" award. X-Play also selected it as "Game of the Year", "Best Original Soundtrack", "Best Writing/Story", and "Best Art Direction". Game Informer named BioShock its Game of the Year for 2007.

At IGN's "Best of 2007" BioShock was nominated for Game of The Year 2007, and won the award for PC Game of the Year, Best Artistic Design, and Best Use of Sound. GameSpy chose it as the third-best game of the year and gave BioShock the awards for Best Sound, Story, and Art Direction. GameSpot awarded the game for Best Story, while GamePro gave BioShock the Best Story, Xbox 360 and Best Single-Player Shooter awards. BioShock won the "Best Visual Art", "Best Writing", and "Best Audio" awards at the 2008 Game Developers Choice Awards. Guinness World Records awarded the game a record for "Most Popular Xbox Live Demo" in the Guinness World Records: Gamer's Edition 2008.  BioShock is ranked first on Game Informer list of The Top 10 Video Game Openings. GamesRadar placed Bioshock as the 12th best game of all time. In 2011 BioShock was awarded the number 1 spot in GameTrailers' "Top 100 Video Game Trailers of All Time", for submerging the viewer into the BioShock universe and its enduring impact. In August 2012, IGN gave it the top spot on their list of the Top 25 Modern PC Games, a ranking of the best PC games released since 2006. In November 2012, Time named it one of the 100 greatest video games of all time. In July 2015, the game placed 9th on USgamer The 15 Best Games Since 2000 list.

Sales
The Xbox 360 version was the third best-selling game of August 2007, with 490,900 copies. The Wall Street Journal reported that shares in Take-Two Interactive "soared nearly 20%" in the week following overwhelmingly favorable early reviews of the game. Take-Two Interactive announced that by June 5, 2008, over 2.2 million copies of BioShock had been shipped. In a June 10, 2008 interview, Roy Taylor, Nvidia's VP of Content Business Development, stated that the PC version has sold over one million copies. According to Take-Two Interactive's chairman Strauss Zelnick, the game had sold around 3 million copies by June 2009. By March 2010, BioShock had sold 4 million copies.

PC technical issues and DRM

The initial Windows release was criticized by players for several perceived shortcomings. The game was shipped with SecuROM copy protection that required activation from 2K Games' servers over the Internet; the unavailability of these servers was reported as the reason for the cancellation of the game's midnight release in Australia. Players found that the SecuROM limited the number of times the game could be activated to two; user feedback led to 2K Games to increase the activation count to five, and later offer a tool that allowed users to revoke previous activations on their own. Ultimately 2K Games removed the activation limit, though retail versions of the game still required the activation process. Levine admitted that their initial approach to the activation process was malformed, harming their reputation during the launch period.

The SecuROM software also caused some virus scanners and malware detector to believe the software was malicious. 2K Games assured players that the software installation process did not install any malicious code or rootkit. However, players observed that some of the SecuROM software was not entirely removed on uninstallation of the game.

Some of the graphic capabilities of BioShock were criticized by players. The initial release of the game was found to have cut off the top and bottom of the field of view in order to fit widescreen monitors, resulting in less vertical view instead of more horizontal view compared to 4:3 monitors, conflicting with original reports from a developer on how widescreen would have been handled. 2K Games later stated that the choice of the field of view was a design decision made during development. Irrational included an option for "Horizontal FOV Lock" in the December 2007 patch that allows widescreen users a wider field of view, without cutting anything off the image vertically. BioShock was also criticized for not supporting pixel shader 2.0b video cards (such as the Radeon X800/X850), which were considered high-end graphics cards in 2004–2005, and accounted for about 24% of surveyed hardware collected through Valve's Steam platform at the time of BioShock release.

On July 8, 2014, 2K Games released a DRM-free version of BioShock on the Humble 2K Bundle, and then re-released on the Humble Store.

On December 17, 2018, BioShock and BioShock 2 remastered were released DRM-free on GOG.

Legacy
BioShock has received praise for its artistic style and compelling storytelling. In their book, Digital Culture: Understanding New Media, Glen Creeber and Royston Martin perform a case study of BioShock as a critical analysis of video games as an artistic medium. They praised the game for its visuals, sound, and ability to engage the player into the story. They viewed BioShock as a sign of the "coming of age" of video games as an artistic medium. John Lanchester of the London Review of Books recognized BioShock as one of the first video games to break into coverage of mainstream media to be covered as a work of art arising from its narrative aspects, whereas before video games had failed to enter into the "cultural discourse", or otherwise covered due to moral controversies they created. Peter Suderman for Vox in 2016 wrote that BioShock was the first game that demonstrated that video games could be a work of art, particularly highlighting that the game plays on the theme of giving the illusion of individual control.

In February 2011, the Smithsonian Institution announced it would hold an exhibit dedicated to the art of video games. Several games were chosen by the Smithsonian's curators; when the public voted for additional games they felt deserved to be included in the exhibition, BioShock was among the winners.

The game's plot twist, where the player discovers that the player-character Jack has been coerced into events by the trigger phrase, "Would you kindly...", is considered one of the strongest narrative elements of recent games, in part that it subverted the expectation that the player has control and influence on the game.  In homage to BioShock, Black Mirror video game-centric episode "Playtest" includes the phrase.

Related media

Sequels

In response to the game's high sales and critical acclaim, Take-Two Interactive chairman Strauss Zelnick revealed in a post-earnings report call that the company now considered the game part of a franchise. He also speculated that any follow-ups would mimic the release cadence of Grand Theft Auto, with a new release expected every two years. 2K's president Christoph Hartmann stated that BioShock could have five sequels, comparing the franchise to the Star Wars movies.

BioShock 2 was announced in 2008, with its development led by 2K Marin. Levine stated that Irrational (then 2K Boston) was not involved in the game's sequel because they wanted to "swing for the fences" and try to come up with something "very, very different", which was later revealed as BioShock Infinite. BioShock 3 was also announced, with its release assumed to likely coincide with the BioShock film. BioShock 2 takes place about ten years following the events of the first game. The player assumes the role of Subject Delta, a precursor of the Big Daddies who must search the fallen city of Rapture for his former Little Sister, Eleanor. BioShock 2 was released for Windows PC, Mac, Xbox 360, and the PlayStation 3 worldwide on February 9, 2010.

While BioShock Infinite, developed by Irrational Games and released in 2013, shares the name and many similar gameplay concepts with BioShock, the title is not a sequel or prequel of the original story, but instead takes place aboard the collapsing air-city of Columbia in the year 1912. It follows former Pinkerton agent Booker DeWitt as he  is he attempts to rescue a young woman, Elizabeth, from the angelic tower in which her father has imprisoned her. Infinite involves the possibilities of multiple universes. In one scene, the game take place at the lighthouse and bathysphere terminus of Rapture as part of this exploration. However, no direct canonical connection is given in the main game. The episodic expansion, Burial at Sea, takes place in Rapture in 1959, before the war between Atlas and Ryan, while continuing the story of Booker and Elizabeth. This content links the two stories while providing expansion on the causes and behind-the-scenes events alluded to by the in-game background from BioShock.

After completing BioShock Infinite and its expansion, Levine announced that he was restructuring Irrational Games to focus on smaller, narrative-driven titles. 2K Games continues to hold on to the BioShock intellectual property and plans to continue to develop games in this series, considering the framework set by Levine and his team as a "rich creative canvas" for more stories.

Limited edition
Following the creation of a fan petition for a special edition, Take-Two Interactive stated that they would publish a special edition of BioShock only if the petition received 5,000 signatures; this number of signatures was reached after just five hours. Subsequently, a poll was posted on the 2K Games operated Cult of Rapture community website in which visitors could vote on what features they would most like to see in a special edition; the company stated that developers would take this poll into serious consideration. To determine what artwork would be used for the Limited Edition cover, 2K Games ran a contest, with the winning entry provided by Crystal Clear Art's owner and graphic designer Adam Meyer.

On April 23, 2007, the Cult of Rapture website confirmed that the Limited Collector's Edition would include a  Big Daddy figurine (many of which were damaged due to a dropped shipping container; a replacement initiative is in place), a "Making Of" DVD, and a soundtrack CD. Before the special edition was released, the proposed soundtrack CD was replaced with The Rapture EP.

Remastered edition

BioShock was remastered to support 1080p and higher framerates as part of the 2016 BioShock: The Collection release for Windows, PlayStation 4, and Xbox One systems. The remastering was performed by Blind Squirrel Games and published by 2K Games. A standalone version of BioShock Remastered was released for macOS by Feral Interactive on August 22, 2017. The standalone version of the remastered version of BioShock along with The Collection were released on May 29, 2020 on the Nintendo Switch.

Printed media
BioShock: Breaking the Mold, a book containing artwork from the game, was released by 2K Games on August 13, 2007. It is available in both low and high resolution, in PDF format from 2K Games' official website. Until October 1, 2007, 2K Games was sending a printed version of the book to the owners of the collector's edition whose Big Daddy figurines had been broken, as compensation for the time it took to replace them. On October 31, 2008, the winners of "Breaking the Mold: Developers Edition Artbook Cover Contest" were announced on cultofrapture.com.

A prequel novel, titled BioShock: Rapture written by John Shirley, was published July 19, 2011. The prequel book details the construction of Rapture and the events leading to its demise. The book follows multiple BioShock characters.

Canceled Universal film adaptation
Industry rumors after the game's release suggested a film adaptation of the game would be made, utilizing similar green screen filming techniques as in the movie 300 to recreate the environments of Rapture. On May 9, 2008, Take-Two Interactive announced a deal with Universal Studios to produce a BioShock movie, to be directed by Gore Verbinski and written by John Logan. The film was expected to be released in 2010, but was put on hold due to budget concerns. On August 24, 2009, it was revealed that Verbinski had dropped out of the project due to the studio's decision to film overseas to keep the budget under control. Verbinski reportedly feels this would have hindered his work on Rango. Then Juan Carlos Fresnadillo was in talks to direct with Verbinski as producer.

In January 2010 the project was in the pre-production stage, with director Juan Carlos Fresnadillo and Braden Lynch, a voice artist from BioShock 2 both working on the film. By July, the film was facing budget issues, but producer Gore Verbinski said they were working it out. He also said the film would be a hard R. Ken Levine, during an interview on August 30, 2010, said: "I will say that it is still an active thing and it's something we are actively talking about and actively working on." Verbinski later cited that by trying to maintain the "R" rating, they were unable to find any studios that would back the effort, putting the film's future in jeopardy.

Levine confirmed in March 2013 that the film had been officially canceled. Levine stated that after Warner's Watchmen film in 2009 did not do as well as the studio expected, they had concerns with the $200 million budget that Verbinski had for the BioShock film. They asked him to consider doing the film on a smaller $80 million budget, but Verbinski did not want to accept this. In February 2017, Verbinski said that his crew was about eight weeks from starting filming, with plans for many elaborate sets given that the setting of Rapture could not be something easily shot on existing locations, requiring the $200 million budget. Verbinski was anticipating on releasing the film with an R-rating when Universal approached him about changing the film's direction. Universal requested that he tone down the film and aim instead for a PG-13 movie, which would be able to draw more audiences to the film and recoup the larger budget he asked for. Verbinski insisted on keeping the R-rating and refused the smaller budget Universal offered to make the R-rated version. Universal felt that that expensive a film with the limited R-rating would be too much of a risk, and pulled him from the film. Universal then subsequently brought in a new director to work with the smaller budget, but Levine and 2K Games did not feel that the new director was a good fit with the material. Universal then let Levine decide to end the project, which he did, believing that the film would not work with the current set of compromises they would have had to make.

In January 2014, artwork from the canceled film surfaced online, showing what an adaptation could have looked like. Verbinski said that there is "all kinds of crazy stuff" from the pre-production stage that still exists, such as screen tests for characters. He noted in the 2017 Reddit piece that with the success of the 2016 film Deadpool, he believes that there is now justification for his vision of the BioShock film.

Netflix film adaptation
In February 2022, Netflix announced it would be adapting the BioShock franchise into a film with Vertigo Entertainment and 2K, a subsidiary of Take-Two Interactive Software, Inc producing. Francis Lawrence was slated to direct with Michael Green to write, as of August 2022.

See also 
 Ludonarrative dissonance — A term coined to describe conflict between narrative aspects of BioShock's story and gameplay.

References
Notes

Footnotes

Further reading
 BioShock: Rapture, by John Shirley (2011)

External links

 
 The Cult of Rapture
 
 

2007 video games
Alternate history video games
BioShock (series) games
Criticism of capitalism
Feral Interactive games
First-person shooters
Immersive sims
Games for Windows certified games
2000s horror video games
Human experimentation in fiction
Interactive Achievement Award winners
IOS games
Irrational Games
Fiction about mind control
Objectivism (Ayn Rand)
MacOS games
PlayStation 3 games
Propaganda in fiction
Science fiction video games
Single-player video games
Take-Two Interactive games
Unreal Engine games
Video games developed in Australia
Video games developed in Canada
Video games developed in the United States
Video games set in 1960
Video games using Havok
Video games with alternate endings
Video games with underwater settings
Weird fiction video games
Windows games
Xbox 360 games
British Academy Games Award for Best Game winners
Video games directed by Ken Levine
Spike Video Game Awards Game of the Year winners
2K games